Helge Koll-Frafjord  (born 31 May 1975) is a former tennis player from Norway.

Tennis career
Koll-Frafjord participated at the 1993 Junior Wimbledon Championship and he made his debut for the Norway Davis Cup team in 1993 against Finland. Koll-Frafjord had a 12-year Davis Cup career and he won 5 of the 17 singles matches and 4 of the 11 doubles matches that he played.

Koll-Frafjord mainly participated on the ATP Challenger Tour and the Futures circuit. He won three singles titles and three doubles titles on the Futures circuit.

ITF Futures titles

Singles: 3

Doubles: 3

See also
Norwegian Davis Cup players

References

External links

 
1975 births
Living people
Norwegian male tennis players